Thomas Joseph Miller (December 13, 1949 – January 28, 2023), known professionally as Tom Verlaine, was an American singer, guitarist, and songwriter, best known as the frontman of the New York City rock band Television.

Biography
Verlaine was born Thomas Joseph Miller in Denville, New Jersey on December 13, 1949. His father, Victor Andrew Miller (1921–2008), was of Lithuanian heritage (originally Miliszauckas), but born in Coatbridge, Scotland. His mother, Lillian (Lilya) Barbara Dopko(wski) (1921–2005) was originally from Pennsylvania and of Polish gentile heritage. Tom's father worked first as a maintenance man and later as a sales manager. Tom had a twin brother, John Peter Miller (1949–1984), who died suddenly at age 34. 

Tom moved to Wilmington, Delaware, with his family at age of six. He began studying piano at an early age, but switched to saxophone in middle school after hearing a record by Stan Getz. Jazz saxophonists such as John Coltrane and Albert Ayler inspired him. Verlaine initially was unimpressed with the role of the guitar in both rock music and jazz, but was inspired to take up the instrument after hearing the Rolling Stones' "19th Nervous Breakdown" during his adolescence, at which point he began a long period of experimentation to develop a personal style. A later musical influence of Verlaine's became jazz musician Miles Davis' electric-period recordings, particularly the Japanese LPs Agharta (1975) and Dark Magus (1977), which he was able to obtain as imports.

Tom's family sent Verlaine and his twin brother John to Sanford Preparatory School, a private boarding school in Hockessin, Delaware. While John excelled in athletics and graduated in 1967, Tom's interest leaned toward writing and poetry. At Sanford, Tom became friends with future bandmate and punk icon Richard Hell (Richard Meyers). They quickly discovered that they shared a passion for music and poetry. Neither Verlaine nor Hell graduated from Sanford and they later moved to New York City.

In New York City, Miller created his stage name, a reference to the French symbolist poet Paul Verlaine. Regarding the name change, rather than the poet being a source of inspiration, Verlaine said, "I just like the sound of the name”.  He and Hell formed the Neon Boys, recruiting drummer Billy Ficca. The Neon Boys quickly disbanded after failing to recruit a second guitarist, despite auditions by Dee Dee Ramone and Chris Stein. They reformed as Television a few months later, finding a guitarist in Richard Lloyd, and began playing at seminal punk clubs like CBGB and Max's Kansas City. In 1975, Verlaine kicked Hell out of the band for his erratic playing and behavior, and they released their first single with Fred Smith replacing Hell. Verlaine dated poet and musician Patti Smith when they were both in the burgeoning New York punk scene. Television released two albums, Marquee Moon and Adventure, to great critical acclaim and modest sales before breaking up in July 1978.

Verlaine soon released a self-titled solo album that began a fruitful 1980s solo career. He took up residence in England for a brief period in response to the positive reception his work had received there and in Europe at large. David Bowie covered Verlaine's "Kingdom Come" on his Scary Monsters (and Super Creeps) album in 1980. In the 1990s he collaborated with different artists, including Patti Smith, and composed a film score for Love and a .45. In the early 1990s, Television reformed to record one studio album (Television) and a live recording (Live at the Academy, 1992); they reunited periodically for touring. Verlaine released his first new album in many years in 2006, titled Songs and Other Things. In the 2010s, he kept on touring with Television, performing Marquee Moon it its entirety: he notably toured in Europe in 2014 and 2016.

Death
Verlaine died in New York City on January 28, 2023 at the age of 73. According to his former guitar partner in Television, Richard Lloyd, Verlaine had “been sick for quite a while,” battling prostate cancer, which had metastasized. Television had been asked to open a European tour for Billy Idol, but Verlaine’s doctors told him he was not in good enough health to do so.

Collaborations
Verlaine was in discussion with Jeff Buckley to produce his second album before Buckley's death by drowning in 1997.

Verlaine guested as guitarist on numerous releases by other artists, including the album Penthouse by the band Luna. He played on Patti Smith's Grammy-nominated "Glitter in Their Eyes" from her 2000 album Gung Ho. This was not the first time Verlaine had collaborated with one-time romantic partner Smith; four years earlier, he played on the songs "Fireflies" and "Summer Cannibals" from her 1996 album Gone Again, and in the 1970s he played guitar on her debut single "Hey Joe" and on "Break It Up" from her debut album Horses. He also co-wrote the latter song with Smith. He played with Smith in 2005 for a 30th-anniversary concert of Horses in its entirety, which was later released on CD.

Verlaine was part of the Million Dollar Bashers, a supergroup also featuring Sonic Youth musicians Lee Ranaldo and Steve Shelley, Wilco guitarist Nels Cline, Bob Dylan bassist Tony Garnier, guitarist Smokey Hormel, and keyboardist John Medeski. Their work appears on the original soundtrack to I'm Not There, a biographical film reflecting on the life of Bob Dylan.

In 2012, Verlaine collaborated with former Smashing Pumpkins guitarist James Iha on his second solo album Look to the Sky.

Musical style

Equipment

Throughout his career Verlaine played a variety of Fender guitars, most frequently Jazzmasters and Jaguars, through Fender amps. On his reasons for choosing the Jazzmaster, Verlaine said, “I think it was financial! In the seventies, when guitars were still cheap, nobody wanted a Jazzmaster because they weren’t loud and didn’t stay in tune. In ’73,’74 you could buy a Jazzmaster for $150 easily. So that’s why I started playing it, because we didn’t have a lot of money and they were cheap. And then I really got used to it, plus the vibrato arm on it is very nice. I use really heavy strings on it—like a 14 to a 58 or something similar—and that’s another part of the sound, I think.”

In laster years, at solo concerts and at Television concerts, Verlaine played a guitar built in the style of a Fender Stratocaster, modified with Danelectro "lipstick" pickups and fitted with a Fender Jazzmaster neck.

Guitar playing and effects

Verlaine was an advocate of guitar techniques and recording processes including close miking, delay, reverb, slap echo, phasing/flanging, tremolo, etc. Television's first commercially released recording, "Little Johnny Jewel", saw Verlaine, in defiance of common practice, plugging his guitar straight into the recording desk with no amplification. Verlaine rarely employed heavy distortion.

Vibrato was a large part of Verlaine's style and he made extensive use of the Jazzmaster's unique vibrato arm. Verlaine used a thin pick and heavy strings (gauges .050 to .013) and tuned down a half step or more. In contrast to most modern rock guitarists, he used a wound 3rd string. Verlaine usually played with the bridge pickup on, but picked over the neck pickup. This, according to him, gave a "full yet clear sound".

The development of Verlaine's style likely was influenced by the way he learned to play; he told a Guitar Player interviewer in 2005 "I never played guitar along with records, so I never learned all the speed licks everybody gravitates to when starting out. I know 19-year-old guitarists who can play Danny Gatton solos note-for-note. They don’t really know what notes they’re playing, but they do them flawlessly."

In popular culture
In 2022, Swedish writer Aris Fioretos published De tunna gudarna ("The Thin Gods"). A novel "about longing and vulnerability, nerves and electricity", it tells the life-story of Ache Middler, an aging rock musician with high demands on artistic precision and clarity, who bears a strong ressemblence to Verlaine. Like Verlaine, he is born in 1949 and grows up in Wilmington. Ache, too, leaves for New York City in the 1960s, where he writes poetry and forms a band (first The Apollo Boys, later Transmission), falls in love with a woman akin to Patti Smith in temperament and beauty, and experiences triumphs with the band’s first records, then enters a kind of no man’s land, good for his artistic development but less advantageous in terms of commercial success. In the end, the real affinity between Ache and Verlaine might be the belief the latter formulated thus in an early interview: "I like thinking of myself as invisible. I find it a very advantageous way to live. Unfortunately, it’s not the way the music business works." According to the front matter of The Thin Gods, the novel explores this invisibility as the backbone of both life and art. An English translation has yet to appear.

Discography

Solo albums
 Tom Verlaine (1979)
 Dreamtime (1981)
 Words from the Front (1982)
 Cover (1984)
 Flash Light (1987)
 The Wonder (1990)
 Warm and Cool (1992, reissued in 2005)
 The Miller's Tale: A Tom Verlaine Anthology (1996)
 Songs and Other Things (2006)
 Around (2006)

Singles
 "Always" / "The Blue Robe" Warner Bros K17855 (September 1981)
 "Postcard from Waterloo" / "Clear It Away" Virgin VS501 (May 1982)
 "Let Go the Mansion" / "Let Go the Mansion - Instrumental version" Virgin VS696 (June 1984)
 "Five Miles of You"  / "Your Finest Hour" Virgin VS704 (August 1984) "Your Finest Hour" was an outtake from Words From the Front sessions
 "A Town Called Walker" / "Smoother Than Jones" Fontana FTANA1 (1987)
 "The Funniest Thing" / "One Time at Sundown" (The London 1986 Version) Fontana VLANE3 (1987) 
 "The Scientist Writes a Letter" / "The Scientist Writes a Letter" (Paris Version) Fontana VLANE4 (1987) 
 "Cry Mercy, Judge" / "Circling"  Fontana FTANA2 (1987)
 "Shimmer" / "Bomb"   Fontana VLANE5 (October 1989)
 "Kaleidoscopin'" / "Sixteen Tulips"  Fontana VLANE6 (March 1990)

References

Sources
 Guinness Rockopedia – 
 The Great Rock Discography (Fifth Edition) –

External links
 The Wonder
 Interview with Tom Verlaine by Sadi Ranson-Polizzotti
 Tom Verlaine's recording of 'Joshua Fought the Battle of Jericho' for Pioneers for a Cure
 
 

1949 births
2023 deaths
American punk rock guitarists
American punk rock singers
American rock songwriters
American rock singers
American rock guitarists
American male guitarists
People from Denville, New Jersey
Musicians from Wilmington, Delaware
Elektra Records artists
Virgin Records artists
Warner Records artists
Fontana Records artists
I.R.S. Records artists
Songwriters from Delaware
Singer-songwriters from New Jersey
Singers from Delaware
20th-century American singers
20th-century American guitarists
21st-century American singers
21st-century American guitarists
Guitarists from Delaware
Guitarists from New Jersey
Television (band) members
Neon Boys members
20th-century American male singers
21st-century American male singers
American post-punk musicians
American male singer-songwriters